Buckinghamia celsissima, commonly known as the ivory curl tree, ivory curl flower or spotted silky oak, is a species of tree in the family Proteaceae. It is endemic to the tropical rainforests of northeastern Queensland, Australia.

Description
While the first few leaves on a new shoot may be deeply lobed, those on older twigs are simple with entire margins (see gallery).

The showy cream-coloured flowers appear over summer and autumn.

Fruits of the ivory curl tree are follicles, green in colour while developing but turning brown or black on maturity.

Taxonomy
This species was described in 1868 by the German-born Australian botanist Ferdinand von Mueller, based on material collected by John Dallachy near Rockingham Bay in 1865. Mueller published his description in volume 6 of his massive work Fragmenta phytographiae Australiae. B. celsissima is one of only two species in the genus, the other being Buckinghamia ferruginiflora, described in 1988.

Etymology
Mueller created the genus Buckinhamia in honour of Richard Temple-Grenville, the 3rd Duke of Buckingham. The species epithet celsissima is from the Latin celsus, meaning "tall", "proud" or "noble", combined with the suffix -issimus, "very".

Distribution and habitat

It grows in well developed rainforest on deep red volcanic soils, as well as drier rainforest types associated with Kauri pine.

Ecology
The ivory curl tree is one of the host species for larvae of the cornelian butterfly. When in flower it will attract a variety of insects to the inflorescences, among them the beetle Dilochrosis brownii, which in turn attracts insectivorous birds. The seeds are eaten by crimson rosellas (Platycercus elegans).

Conservation
This species is listed by the Queensland Department of Environment and Science as least concern. , it has not been assessed by the IUCN.

Cultivation
The ivory curl tree has become a popular planting in parks, streets and private gardens in regions far beyond the natural range of the tree. Its popularity is due to the ease of cultivation, the mass flowering and its variable foliage shape and colour.

Gallery

References

External links
 
 
 View a map of historical sightings of this species at the Australasian Virtual Herbarium
 View observations of this species on iNaturalist
 View images of this species on Flickriver

celsissima
Endemic flora of Queensland
Proteales of Australia
Flora of Queensland
Plants described in 1868
Taxa named by Ferdinand von Mueller